France 1 may refer to:

 FR-1 (satellite), a French satellite also known as France 1
 France 1 (ship) a weather ship preserved at La Rochelle
 Outre-Mer 1ère, a France Télévisions network
 TF1, French TV network privatized in 1987